Cultellunguis is a genus of soldier beetles in the family Cantharidae. There are about nine described species in Cultellunguis.

Species
These nine species belong to the genus Cultellunguis:
 Cultellunguis americanus (Pic, 1906) i g
 Cultellunguis hatchi McKey-Fender, 1950 i g
 Cultellunguis ingenuus (LeConte, 1881) i g b
 Cultellunguis larvalis (LeConte, 1857) i g
 Cultellunguis lautus (LeConte, 1851) i g
 Cultellunguis mackenziei McKey-Fender, 1950 i g
 Cultellunguis macnabianus McKey-Fender, 1950 i g
 Cultellunguis ochropus (LeConte, 1881) i g
 Cultellunguis perpallens (Fall, 1936) i g b
Data sources: i = ITIS, c = Catalogue of Life, g = GBIF, b = Bugguide.net

References

Further reading

 
 

Cantharidae
Articles created by Qbugbot